This is a list of notable events in country music that took place in 2004.

Top hits of the year
The following songs placed within the Top 20 on the Hot Country Songs charts in 2004:

Top new album releases
The following albums placed within the Top 50 on the Top Country Albums charts in 2004:

Other top albums

Deaths
June 10 – Ray Charles, 73, multi-talented artist who combined elements of pop, rhythm and blues, soul and jazz with country music.
August 9 – Sam Hogin, 52 or 53, co-writer of "A Broken Wing" and other 1990s country singles
September 19 – Skeeter Davis, 72, best known for "The End of the World."
September 23 – Roy Drusky, 74, Grand Ole Opry star and smooth countrypolitan stylist of the 1960s.
October 11 – Max D. Barnes, 68, songwriter and record producer whose peak came in the 1980s and early 1990s.
October 24 – Angela Herzberg, 36, wife of Gary Allan. (suicide)
December 27 – Hank Garland, 74, country and jazz guitar pioneer.

Hall of Fame inductees

Bluegrass Music Hall of Fame inductees
John Ray "Curly" Seckler
Bill Vernon

Country Music Hall of Fame inductees
Jim Foglesong (born 1922)
Kris Kristofferson (born 1936)

Canadian Country Music Hall of Fame inductees
The Good Brothers
"Weird" Harold Kendall

Major awards

Grammy Awards
(presented February 13, 2005 in Los Angeles)
Best Female Country Vocal Performance – "Redneck Woman", Gretchen Wilson
Best Male Country Vocal Performance – "Live Like You Were Dying", Tim McGraw.
Best Country Performance by a Duo or Group with Vocal – "Top of the World (live recording)", Dixie Chicks
Best Country Collaboration with Vocals – "Portland, Oregon", Loretta Lynn and Jack White
Best Country Instrumental Performance – "Earl's Breakdown", Nitty Gritty Dirt Band featuring Earl Scruggs, Randy Scruggs, Vassar Clements and Jerry Douglas
Best Country Song – "Live Like You Were Dying", Tim Nichols and Craig Wiseman
Best Country Album – Van Lear Rose, Loretta Lynn
Best Bluegrass Album – Brand New Strings, Ricky Skaggs & Kentucky Thunder

Juno Awards
(presented April 3, 2005 in Winnipeg)
Country Recording of the Year – One Good Friend, George Canyon

CMT Flameworthy Video Music Awards
(presented April 21 in Nashville)
Video of the Year – "American Soldier", Toby Keith
Male Video of the Year – "There Goes My Life", Kenny Chesney
Female Video of the Year – "Forever and for Always", Shania Twain
Group/Duo Video of the Year – "I Melt", Rascal Flatts
Breakthrough Video of the Year – "What Was I Thinkin'", Dierks Bentley
Collaborative Video of the Year – "Beer for My Horses", Toby Keith and Willie Nelson
Hottest Video of the Year – "No Shoes, No Shirt, No Problems", Kenny Chesney
Cameo of the Year – "Celebrity", Jason Alexander, James Belushi, Little Jimmy Dickens, Trista Rehn, William Shatner, Brad Paisley
Video Director of the Year – "Beer for My Horses", Toby Keith and Willie Nelson (Director: Michael Salomon)
Johnny Cash Visionary Award – Reba McEntire

Americana Music Honors & Awards 
Album of the Year – Van Lear Rose (Loretta Lynn)
Artist of the Year – Loretta Lynn
Song of the Year – "Fate's Right Hand" (Rodney Crowell)
Emerging Artist of the Year – Mindy Smith
Instrumentalist of the Year – Will Kimbrough
Spirit of Americana/Free Speech Award – Steve Earle
Lifetime Achievement: Songwriting – Cowboy Jack Clement
Lifetime Achievement: Performance – Chris Hillman
Lifetime Achievement: Executive – Jack Emerson

Academy of Country Music
(presented May 17, 2005 in Las Vegas)
Entertainer of the Year – Kenny Chesney
Song of the Year – "Live Like You Were Dying", Tim Nichols and Craig Wiseman
Single of the Year – "Live Like You Were Dying", Tim McGraw
Album of the Year – Be Here, Keith Urban
Top Male Vocalist – Keith Urban
Top Female Vocalist – Gretchen Wilson
Top Vocal Duo – Brooks & Dunn
Top Vocal Group – Rascal Flatts
Top New Artist – Gretchen Wilson
Video of the Year – "Whiskey Lullaby", Brad Paisley and Alison Krauss (Director: Rick Schroder)
Vocal Event of the Year – "Whiskey Lullaby", Brad Paisley and Alison Krauss
ACM/Home Depot Humanitarian of the Year – Neal McCoy

ARIA Awards 
(presented in Sydney on October 17, 2004)
Best Country Album – Wayward Angel (Kasey Chambers)

Canadian Country Music Association
(presented September 13 in Edmonton)
Kraft Cheez Whiz Fans' Choice Award – Terri Clark
Male Artist of the Year – Jason McCoy
Female Artist of the Year – Terri Clark
Group or Duo of the Year – Doc Walker
SOCAN Song of the Year – "Die of a Broken Heart", Carolyn Dawn Johnson
Single of the Year – "Simple Life", Carolyn Dawn Johnson
Album of the Year – Dress Rehearsal, Carolyn Dawn Johnson
Top Selling Album – Greatest Hits Volume II, Alan Jackson
CMT Video of the Year – "Simple Life", Carolyn Dawn Johnson
Chevy Trucks Rising Star Award – George Canyon
Roots Artist or Group of the Year – Corb Lund

Country Music Association
(presented November 9 in Nashville)
Entertainer of the Year – Kenny Chesney
Song of the Year – "Live Like You Were Dying", Tim Nichols and Craig Wiseman
Single of the Year – "Live Like You Were Dying", Tim McGraw
Album of the Year – When the Sun Goes Down, Kenny Chesney
Male Vocalist of the Year – Keith Urban
Female Vocalist of the Year – Martina McBride
Vocal Duo of the Year – Brooks & Dunn
Vocal Group of the Year – Rascal Flatts
Horizon Award – Gretchen Wilson
Video of the Year – "Whiskey Lullaby", Brad Paisley and Alison Krauss (Director: Rick Schroder)
Vocal Event of the Year – "Whiskey Lullaby", Brad Paisley and Alison Krauss
Musician of the Year – Dann Huff

Further reading
Whitburn, Joel, "Top Country Songs 1944–2005 – 6th Edition." 2005.

See also
Country Music Association
Inductees of the Country Music Hall of Fame

References

External links
Country Music Hall of Fame

Country
Country music by year